Brandon Scott Trost (born August 29, 1981) is an American cinematographer, screenwriter, and film director whose credits include writing and directing The FP (2011) with his brother Jason, as well as being the cinematographer of several films, including Crank: High Voltage, Halloween II, MacGruber, Ghost Rider: Spirit of Vengeance and That's My Boy. Trost is also a frequent collaborator with Seth Rogen, including the films This Is the End, Neighbors, The Interview, The Night Before and Neighbors 2: Sorority Rising. Trost's first film as a solo director, An American Pickle, was released in 2020.

Early life 
Trost was born in 1981 in Los Angeles, California, to Karen (née French) and Ron Trost, a special effects coordinator. His grandfather, Scott Maitland, was an assistant director, and his great-grandfather was a stuntman. His uncle was actor Victor French. He attended Frazier Mountain High School and later graduated from Los Angeles Film School. He grew up in Frazier Park, California with his brother Jason and sister Sarah.

Influences 
Trost has cited Andrew Laszlo as one of his favorite cinematographers, calling Streets of Fire "one of the most amazing-looking movies from the 1980s."

Filmography

As director

As cinematographer

As actor

References

External links 

1981 births
Living people
American cinematographers
People from Los Angeles